Philip Huang Chao-ming (born 23 August 1954) is the fourth and current Roman Catholic bishop of Hualien. He was ordained a priest in 1983. He became bishop of Hualien in 2001.

References

1954 births
Living people
21st-century Roman Catholic bishops in Taiwan
Taiwanese people of Hakka descent
People from Hualien County